The Theological Seminary of St. Peter of Cetinje is a secondary Orthodox theological school of Serbian Orthodox Church in Cetinje, Montenegro. The rector of the seminary is archpriest-staurophore Gojko Perović.

History

Pre-foundation 
The first school for theologians existed at the Cetinje Monastery during the time of Serbian Metropolitan Petar I Petrović Njegoš (St. Peter of Cetinje). Metropolitan Petar II Petrović Njegoš also studied there.

The temporary seminary in Cetinje was founded in September 1863 by Archimandrite Nićifor Dučić, with the help of Archimandrite Ilariona Roganović, later Metropolitan.

This was the first high school in principality of Montenegro and could only be enrolled by Cetinje primary school students. Only a few months later, the seminary stopped working, since there were no material means for its functioning.

Seminary of Cetinje 
Emperor of all the Russias Alexander II Nikolayevich Romanov met with Prince Nikola Petrovic Njegos in St. Petersburg in 1868. In their talks, it was agreed that the Russian imperial court would help the work of the new seminary on an annual level with 8,000 rubles, as well as the opening of the Girls' Institute next to the seminary with 5,500 rubles. The task of the Girls' Institute was to educate girls, who would later marry theologians.

The Constitution and the curriculum were written by Archpriest Mikhail Rajevski (serving at the Russian Embassy in Vienna) and Master Milan Kostić, who was educated at the Theological Academy in Kiev. Together they prepared the first textbooks. The Holy Synod of the Russian Orthodox Church then gave confirmation and blessing of the work plan, so the seminary solemnly began its work 18 September 1869 in Billiards. For the first rector of the Cetinje seminary, Prince Nikola appointed Milan Kostić, who was subordinate to Metropolitan of Montenegro-Brdo to Hilarion II as the supreme manager.

At first, the seminary was three years old and accepted ten students each, who lived in a boarding school. From 1873. year, the seminary was moved to Ostrog Monastery, and 1875 It temporarily suspended its work due to the outbreak of the Herzegovinian Uprising and the forthcoming Montenegrin-Turkish War. A nine-year work stoppage followed.

Seminary and Profession School 
In August 1887, Prince Nikola approved a new school program for the three-year Theological-Teaching School, which was enrolled by high school graduates with great success. The students did not live in the boarding school, and the rectory of the school was merged with the management of the gymnasium in Cetinje. It has not worked since 1905 to 1907 year, when it was established as a four-year school.

February 1891 year, the students started the magazine "Cetinjski bogoslovac, list za književnost", which had as its motto Njegošev the verse: "The nobility breathes Serbia" The students were mobilized in Balkan Wars, so an extraordinary exam was organized.

Money from Russian Empire regularly reached 1915 to January 1916. year, when due to Austro-Hungarian occupation Montenegro the Cetinje seminary stopped working. The school archive was destroyed during the occupation.

Theological Seminary of "St. Peter of Cetinje" 
The seminary worked at the end 1943. and early 1944 years, to ensure that students in the final grade pass the final exams. Thus, the Cetinje seminary was the only seminary Serbian Orthodox Church that operated during the war.

Until 1944, about 400 students graduated from the seminary. Many of them perished in World War II, both from the fascist occupiers and the post-war Communist government. A school was forcibly expelled from Billiards. Knowing what to expect from the communists, Metropolitan Joanikije tried to escape with seventy priests Partisans captured them and shot the priests in Zidani Most, and took Metropolitan Joanikija to Arandjelovac and after torturing and killed 18 June 1945, and buried in a hitherto unknown location.

Cetinje Seminary 
In the fall 1992, the Cetinje seminary was renovated. The decision on the renewal was made at the regular May session Holy Synod of Bishops of the Serbian Orthodox Church, and at the suggestion of Metropolitan of Montenegro and the Littoral. The seminary officially began its work 13. September 1992. The ceremony in the building of the Church Court, which served to house the seminary, was attended by Metropolitan Danilo Dajković, Metropolitan Amfilohije, Minister of Education Predrag Obradović and Minister of Religion Slobodan Tomović.

On the occasion of the completion of the education of the first generation of theologians, a pilgrimage to Christ's tomb and a tour Holy Land were organized. They took the Matura exam before Archpriest Dr. Predrag Puzović, envoy Holy Synod of Bishops. The Cetinje seminary is in September 1995 received a new rector – Joanikije Mićović. From that time he performed this duty until 1 September 2002, when he was appointed acting rector archpriest-staurophore Gojko Perović. At the May session Holy Synod of Bishops in May 2016, he was appointed rector.

Premises 
Since the Government of Montenegro refuses to cede Billiards to the seminary, it uses three separate facilities. Classrooms and the administration of the seminary are located in the building of the Church Court. In a prefabricated prefabricated building 1996, there is a dining room, kitchen, warehouse and bathroom. The old seminary building serves as a boarding school.

Patriarch Pavle consecrated the cornerstone for the new building of the Cetinje seminary in 1993.

Elders and Rectors

Alumni 

 Metropolitan of Montenegro and the Littoral Danilo Dajković (1961–1990);
 Bishop of Upper Karlovac Simeon (1951–1990);

References 

Educational institutions of the Serbian Orthodox Church
Religious buildings and structures in Montenegro
Educational institutions established in 1871
Serbian Orthodox Church in Montenegro
Secondary schools in Montenegro